Chandrasekhar–Fermi method  or CF method or Davis–Chandrasekhar–Fermi method is a method that is used to calculate the mean strength of the interstellar magnetic field that is projected on the plane of the sky. The method was described by Subrahmanyan Chandrasekhar and Enrico Fermi in 1953 and independently by Leverett Davis Jr in 1951. According to this method, the magnetic field  in the plane of the sky is given by

The method is also employed for prestellar molecular clouds.

References

Astrophysics